Eric the Red is the second full-length album by the Faroese Viking / folk metal band Týr. It was released on 27 June 2003 by Tutl.

The album is trilingual with Faroese and English as the predominant languages. The song "Ramund Hin Unge" is sung in Danish (specifically Gøtudanskt).

The album was re-released on 24 March 2006 by Napalm Records with a new cover artwork and two additional tracks originally from a demo released in 2000.

The original cover features a painting by Haukur L. Halldórsson titled The Ocean God. The re-release album features cover art by Jan Yrlund.

Track listing

Credits
 Heri Joensen – vocals, guitar
 Terji Skibenæs – guitar
 Gunnar H. Thomsen – bass
 Kári Streymoy – drums

References

2003 albums
Týr (band) albums
Cultural depictions of Erik the Red